OpenRC is a dependency-based init system for Unix-like computer operating systems. It was created by Roy Marples, a NetBSD developer who was also active in the Gentoo project. It became more broadly adopted as an init system outside of Gentoo following the decision by some Linux distributions not to adopt systemd.

Adoption 
OpenRC is the default init system and/or process supervisor for:

 Alpine Linux
 Funtoo
 Gentoo Linux
 Hyperbola GNU/Linux-libre
 Maemo Leste
 Nitrux

OpenRC is an available init system and/or process supervisor for:

 Artix Linux
 Devuan
 Parabola GNU/Linux-libre
 Arch Linux

Design 
OpenRC is made up of several modular components, the main ones being an init (optional), the core dependency management system and a daemon supervisor (optional). It is written in C and POSIX-compliant shell, making it usable on BSD and Linux systems.

The core part of OpenRC handles dependency management and init script parsing. OpenRC works by scanning the runlevels, building a dependency graph, then starting the needed service scripts. It exits once the scripts have been started. By default, OpenRC uses a modified version of start-stop-daemon for daemon management.

Init scripts share similarities with scripts used in sysvinit, but offer several features to simplify their creation. The depend function is used to declare dependencies to other services that would be done with LSB headers in sysvinit. Configuration and mechanism are separated with configuration files in the conf.d directory and init files in the init.d directory.

Several other inits are supported, including sysvinit and Busybox.

Supervise-daemon first appeared in version 0.21 giving OpenRC supervision capabilities. It can be enabled in the init script for supervise-daemon to start and monitor a daemon. Several other daemon supervisors are supported, including runit and s6.

Features 

 Portable between Linux, FreeBSD, and NetBSD
 Parallel service startup (off by default)
 Dependency-based boot-up
 Process segregation through cgroups
 Per-service resource limits (ulimit)
 Separation of code and configuration (init.d / conf.d)
 Extensible startup scripts
 Stateful init scripts (is it started already?)
 Complex init scripts to start multiple components (Samba [smbd and nmbd], NFS [nfsd, portmap, etc.])
 Automatic dependency calculation and service ordering
 Modular architecture and separation of optional components (cron, syslog)
 Expressive and flexible network handling (including VPN, bridges, etc.)
 Verbose debug mode

References 

Software using the BSD license
Unix process- and task-management-related software